Vladimir Markotić (born June 17, 1980) is a Bosnian Croat retired goalkeeper who played in the Premier League of Bosnia and Herzegovina, Croatian First Football League, Second League of the Federation of Bosnia and Herzegovina, and the Canadian Soccer League.

Club career 
Markotić began his career in 2003 with NK Brotnjo in the First League of Herzeg-Bosnia. The next season, he signed with FK Željezničar Sarajevo, before transferring to the Croatian First Football League to sign with NK Zagreb. In 2007, he returned to Bosnia to play with NK Posušje of the Premier League of Bosnia and Herzegovina. In 2011, he went overseas to Canada to sign with Brantford Galaxy of the Canadian Soccer League. In 2012, he signed with rivals London City, and in 2013 he assisted London in clinching a postseason berth for the first time since the 2000 season. He featured in the quarterfinals against York Region Shooters, and advanced to the next round. Their opponents were Kingston FC, but were eliminated from the playoffs by a score of 4–2.

References

1980 births
Living people
People from Čitluk, Bosnia and Herzegovina
Croats of Bosnia and Herzegovina
Association football goalkeepers
Bosnia and Herzegovina footballers
NK Brotnjo players
FK Željezničar Sarajevo players
NK Zagreb players
HŠK Posušje players
Brantford Galaxy players
London City players
Premier League of Bosnia and Herzegovina players
Croatian Football League players
Canadian Soccer League (1998–present) players
Bosnia and Herzegovina expatriate footballers
Expatriate footballers in Croatia
Bosnia and Herzegovina expatriate sportspeople in Croatia
Expatriate soccer players in Canada
Bosnia and Herzegovina expatriate sportspeople in Canada